Cephaloleia eumorpha is a species of rolled-leaf beetle in the family Chrysomelidae, first found in Panama.

References

Further reading

Staines, Charles L., and Carlos García-Robledo. "The genus Cephaloleia Chevrolat, 1836 (Coleoptera, Chrysomelidae, Cassidinae)." ZooKeys 436 (2014): 1.

External links

Cassidinae
Beetles of Central America